The Pacasmayo Province is one of twelve provinces of the La Libertad Region in Peru; also Pacasmayo is the name of one of its districts. The capital of this province is the city of San Pedro de Lloc.

Political division
The province is divided into five districts, which are:

See also
La Libertad Region
Chepen Province
Ascope Province

Provinces of the La Libertad Region